Adílio is a name. People with that name include:

 Adílio (footballer, born 1956), born Adílio de Oliveira Gonçalves, Brazilian football midfielder and manager
 Adílio (footballer, born 1993), born Adílio Correa dos Santos, Brazilian football forward for Arouca